Guarianthe skinneri is a species of orchid. It is native to Costa Rica; from Chiapas to every country in Central America.

Guarianthe skinneri is the national flower of Costa Rica, where it is known as guaria morada. It was referenced as Cattleya skinneri as the earlier name by James Bateman in 1839. The range of G. skinneri extends from the southern Mexican border into Costa Rica where it is the national flower.

References

External links

skinneri
Orchids of Central America
Orchids of Belize
Orchids of Chiapas
Plants described in 1839

National symbols of Costa Rica